This list of museums in Maryland encompasses museums, defined for this context as institutions (including nonprofit organizations, government entities, and private businesses) that collect and care for objects of cultural, artistic, scientific, or historical interest and make their collections or related exhibits available for public viewing. Museums that exist only in cyberspace (i.e., virtual museums) are not included.

Museums

Defunct Museums 
 American Dime Museum, Baltimore, museum of curiosities
 Antique Toy Museum, Baltimore, closed in 2012
 Bagpipe Museum, Ellicott City
 Brannock Maritime Museum, Cambridge - collections merged with Richardson Maritime Museum in 2004
 Christian Heritage Museum, Hagerstown
 Contemporary Museum, Baltimore, closed in 2012
 Fells Point Maritime Museum, Baltimore, collections now at Maryland Center for History and Culture
 Mount Vernon Museum of Incandescent Lighting, Baltimore, 2002, collection now at Baltimore Museum of Industry,
 Museum of Menstruation and Women's Health, New Carrollton, closed in 1998, now online only,
 National Children's Museum was located in National Harbor from 2012 to 2015
 Peale Museum, Baltimore - holdings transferred to Maryland Historical Society in 1999
 PlayWiseKids, Columbia
 Presidential Pet Museum,  moved from Annapolis to President's Park, Williamsburg, VA
 Queen City Transportation Museum, Cumberland, closed in 2011
 Ripken Museum, Aberdeen, memorabilia about baseball player Cal Ripken and family, baseball memorabilia
 U.S. Army Ordnance Museum, Aberdeen, closed Maryland museum location in 2010, moving to Fort Lee, Virginia, outdoor exhibits still on display
 Waters House History Center, Germantown, closed in 2010
 Wheels of Yesterday, Ocean City, closed in 2012

See also 
 List of museums in Baltimore
 Nature Centers in Maryland

References

External links 

 Maryland Manual On-Line: Maryland at a Glance: Museums

Museums
Maryland
Museums